The 1954–55 Colorado Buffaloes Men's basketball team represented the University of Colorado in the 1954–55 NCAA men's basketball season. Led by fifth-year head coach Bebe Lee, the Buffaloes were Big Seven Conference champions and made a run to the Final Four of the NCAA tournament. In the National semifinals, Colorado lost to Bill Russell and San Francisco by a respectable 62–50 margin. The Buffaloes bounced back in the consolation game to defeat Iowa to finish the season with a 19–6 record (11–1 Big Seven).

Roster

Schedule and results

|-
!colspan=9 style=| Non-conference regular season

|-
!colspan=9 style=| Big 7 Regular season

|-
!colspan=9 style=| NCAA Tournament

Rankings

NBA draft

References

Colorado Buffaloes men's basketball seasons
Colorado
NCAA Division I men's basketball tournament Final Four seasons
Colorado